The 2004 Supercoppa Italiana was a match contested by the 2003–04 winners Milan and the 2003–04 Coppa Italia winners Lazio.

The match result was a 3–0 victory for Milan after a hat-trick by Andriy Shevchenko.

Match details

2004
Supercoppa 2004
Supercoppa 2004
Supercoppa Italiana
August 2004 sports events in Europe